Samuel Green (1740–1796) was an English organ builder.

Green learnt his art under the elder John Byfield, Richard Bridge, and Abraham Jordan, and afterwards entered into several years' partnership with the younger Byfield. Green built a large number of organs for the cathedrals and churches in London and the country, instruments which were famed for their beauty of tone. Green died in near poverty at Isleworth, Middlesex, 14 September 1796, leaving his business to his widow.

References

External links
David Wickens, Samuel Green (continued from previous issue), BIOS Reporter X: 1, (January 1986)

1740 births
1796 deaths
18th-century English people
People from Isleworth
Organ builders of the United Kingdom
Musical instrument manufacturing companies of the United Kingdom